Frank Shamrock (born Frank Alisio Juarez III; December 8, 1972) is an American former professional mixed martial artist. Shamrock was the first to hold the UFC Middleweight Championship (later renamed the UFC Light Heavyweight Championship) and retired a four-time defending undefeated champion. Shamrock was the No. 1 ranked pound for pound UFC fighter in the world during his reign as the UFC Middleweight Champion. Shamrock has won numerous titles in other martial arts organizations, including the interim King of Pancrase title, the WEC Light Heavyweight Championship and the Strikeforce Middleweight Championship. Shamrock is regarded as one of the first complete mixed martial artists, having adapted his game from a ground-focused style of fighting to a more well-rounded and versatile style.

He was named "Fighter of the Decade" for the 1990s by the Wrestling Observer, "Best Full Contact Fighter" by Black Belt magazine (1998), and three time "Fighter of the Year" by Full Contact Fighter Magazine. He is a seventh degree black belt in submission fighting, awarded by O-Sensei Philip S. Porter of the United States Martial Arts Association. He is the adopted brother of Ken Shamrock.

Shamrock was a color commentator for Showtime Networks, Bellator MMA, Glory Kickboxing and Combate Americas. Shamrock has been a brand spokesman for Strikeforce, VAS, UFC, and K-1 MMA.

After retiring from MMA competition Shamrock retired in Southern California.

Early life
Born into a Mexican-Native family, Frank Juarez was placed in various foster homes, group homes, and crisis centers from the age of twelve onwards. He had many run-ins with law enforcement until eventually he went to live with Bob Shamrock, who with his wife Dede, had taken in thousands of troubled boys (including Frank's older adoptive brother Ken). Juarez went to live with Shamrock at his home in Susanville, California, and was officially adopted by Bob Shamrock at the age of 21, and legally changed his name from Juarez to Shamrock thereafter.

In the early 1990s, Shamrock served three-and-a-half years in the Folsom State Prison after being convicted of burglary.

Mixed martial arts career

Pancrase
In 1994 Ken began to train Frank in what they referred to as "submission fighting", which essentially was the Pancrase style of catch wrestling modified for No Holds Barred fighting. Frank accompanied his brother to bouts in the Ultimate Fighting Championship (UFC) and grew to love the sport. He became a member of Ken's training school, the Lion's Den, and made his mixed martial arts debut in the Pancrase organization in Japan.

Shamrock debuted as a fighter in Pancrase on December 16, 1994, in one of the biggest events in mixed martial arts history to date, the King of Pancrase Tournament. He was an important underdog against top Pancrase fighter Bas Rutten but went on to defeat Rutten in a close decision victory. Shamrock faced off against expert grappler and eventual tournament finalist Manabu Yamada later that night, but was defeated via submission at 8:38 of round 1.

In 1995, Shamrock would get a win over Katsuomi Inagaki, but he faced next his own trainer, MMA legend and Pancrase co-founder Masakatsu Funaki, who defeated him. He would bounce back with a victory over the other founder of the promotion, Minoru Suzuki, getting a KO after a flurry of strikes.

The same year, Frank would also fight a controversial bout with Carlson Gracie BJJ black belt Allan Goes. The Brazilian illegally eye-gouged Shamrock while on his back without the referee noticing, and also refused to release a rear naked choke despite Shamrock using a rope escape, an action which finally gained him a yellow card. On the other hand, Frank retaliated by breaking his leg with a heel hook. Both fighters ended the match with a point lost, and it was ruled a draw despite Goes's penalization.

Shortly after, Shamrock faced Bas Rutten for a second time. He failed to execute his gameplan of taking down Rutten, and the two fell between the ring ropes to the floor in a specially hard-fought attempt. Shamrock then devised a new strategy and started mocking and taunting Rutten during a leglock exchange, in order to get the Dutch fighter angry enough to commit an infraction. The plan was successful, and Frank won a point when Rutten gained a yellow card for hitting him with a closed fist, but Shamrock still lost the match by decision.

On November, Shamrock fought Funaki in a rematch. This time the two fighters traded rope escapes, and Frank caught Funaki in a toehold which made him tap out. Shamrock, however, believes that Funaki took a dive and allowed himself to be defeated in order to build Frank's popularity.

After an injury prevented King of Pancrase Bas Rutten from defending his title, an interim championship was created. Shamrock faced Olympic alternate wrestler and master submission grappler Minoru Suzuki on January 28, 1996, for the vacant belt in a match that drew widespread anticipation. In an epic bout, Shamrock submitted Suzuki with a kneebar at the 22:53 mark of the fight to win the King of Pancrase interim title in front of a sellout crowd in Yokohama.

Shamrock scored decision wins over Ryushu Yanagisawa and Osami Shibuya before facing off against Bas Rutten for the third time for the undisputed King of Pancrase title. Rutten won the bout via TKO due to a cut stoppage when a tired Shamrock received a knee to the forehead in a takedown attempt.

Shamrock then avenged his loss to Manabu Yamada in his next bout, scoring an impressive submission win over the talented grappler. However, after his adopted brother Ken left the organization following a dispute with management, Frank was fired in retaliation.

Post-Pancrase
On January 17, 1997, he lost to John Lober in Hawaii's Superbrawl by split decision. Despite dominating the first three minutes of the fight, including a leglock which broke Lober's ankle and some strikes which blew out his front teeth, Shamrock's lack of cardio became a factor, and Lober was able to come back and punish him until winning the decision. After his loss, Shamrock shifted the focus of his career exclusively to mixed martial arts. Shamrock then fought top ranked Japanese fighter Tsuyoshi Kohsaka in RINGS and defeated Kohsaka by decision.

Within the Lion's Den, Shamrock trained up-and-coming stars such as Jerry Bohlander, Pete Williams, and Guy Mezger. However, after a falling out with the team's management, he left and formed The Alliance team with Maurice Smith, who he developed a close relationship with. Smith trained him kickboxing along with Javier Mendez, while Shamrock taught Smith his style of submission wrestling. Later, Tsuyoshi Kohsaka himself joined the team.

Cornered by The Alliance, Shamrock fought Enson Inoue in a bout in Vale Tudo Japan '97 that would determine who would fight Kevin Jackson for the newly created UFC Middleweight Championship. After an exciting back and forth battle, in which Shamrock's training proved instrumental to resist the punishment and the exhaustion, Frank knocked Inoue out with a knee, although the match was officially ruled as a disqualification win due to Enson's brother, Egan, running into the ring after Shamrock had knocked out Inoue. Shamrock later stated that this was the toughest fight in his career.

Ultimate Fighting Championship
After the win over Inoue, Shamrock joined the UFC and fought Kevin Jackson for the newly created UFC Middleweight Championship (later renamed the UFC Light Heavyweight Championship). Jackson had won the middleweight tournament at UFC 14 and was undefeated in MMA at the time, and was also the Olympic gold medalist in freestyle wrestling for the 1992 Summer Olympics. Despite being a heavy underdog, Shamrock armbarred Jackson in just 16 seconds to win the championship.

Shamrock then made his first title defense against then undefeated Extreme Fighting champion Russian Igor Zinoviev at UFC 16. Zinoviev was a feared Russian kickboxer and sambo specialist who held wins over Mario Sperry and Enson Inoue. Shamrock shot a double leg takedown and slammed Zinoviev down so hard that it knocked him unconscious. Zinoviev suffered a broken collarbone and a fractured C-5 vertebra from the slam and had to be carried out on a stretcher. Zinoviev's fight with Shamrock forced him to retire permanently from mixed martial arts ending the Russian's career. Shamrock then defended his belt against Jeremy Horn at UFC 17, submitting him with a kneebar. In October 1998, Shamrock avenged his earlier loss to John Lober by beating him decisively in 7 minutes at UFC Brazil.

In September 1999, Shamrock defended the UFC Middleweight Championship against future UFC Light Heavyweight Champion Tito Ortiz at UFC 22. Ortiz had exploded as a star after his confrontation with Shamrock's brother Ken and his Lion's Den camp at UFC 19. The bout was hyped as a grudge, as Shamrock was a former Lion's Den member who, according to the marketing, was out for revenge against Ortiz. However, this was not necessarily the case because Shamrock had left the Lion's Den on bad terms a year and a half earlier. Despite dominating his opponents in his previous title defenses, Shamrock was considered to be an underdog in this fight; Ortiz had come off convincing wins over Shamrock's former teammates Jerry Bohlander and Guy Mezger and popular opinion was that Ortiz was too big and strong for him to deal with (Ortiz cut weight to fight and by the time he stepped into the cage he would have  on Shamrock).

However, in what is widely considered to be one of the greatest fights in UFC history, Shamrock won after brutal elbows, punches, and hammer blows forced Ortiz to tap out at the end of round 4. Shamrock has stated that Ortiz was his toughest opponent physically due to his weight advantage and style of fighting. With this win, Shamrock solidified himself as perhaps the greatest UFC champion in history to that date, going 5–0 in title fights and finishing each fight decisively. After the win, UFC owner Bob Meyrowitz and announcer Jeff Blatnick both praised Shamrock as the greatest competitor in the history of the UFC.

Shamrock then relinquished his title and retired from the UFC. After retiring, he briefly acted as a consultant and commentator for the company. In an interview, UFC president Dana White said:

I've talked to Frank Shamrock many times. Frank Shamrock will lead you to believe that we've never talked and we completely have hated each other forever and everything else. He's a weird guy. He's a very, very weird guy. I can't explain it. Frank is a weird guy.

Return
After a brief retirement, Shamrock returned to mixed martial arts as a career. He signed a deal to fight Brazilian Jiu-Jitsu standout Elvis Sinosic at K-1, the premiere kickboxing event in the world. Shamrock beat Sinosic via unanimous decision after five three-minute rounds. Later, when Sinosic faced Tito Ortiz for the UFC light-heavyweight title (formerly the middleweight title) at UFC 32, Shamrock served as guest commentator. On August 11, 2001, he took on his former student, Shannon Ritch in a kickboxing match for K-1. Just 56 seconds into the first round, Shamrock broke Ritch's arm with a roundhouse kick and thereby won the match.

Shamrock helped to train UFC veteran B.J. Penn for his early bouts with the UFC at the American Kickboxing Academy and produced his own events Bushido and ShootBox. His first MMA match since 1999 was winning the WEC light-heavyweight championship in under two minutes from Bryan Pardoe by submission in March 2003.

On March 10, 2006, at Strikeforce: Shamrock vs. Gracie, the first MMA event sanctioned by the state of California, he knocked out Cesar Gracie in 21 seconds. Gracie had never fought an MMA match and was 40 years old, so the fight was considered a serious mismatch. However, Gracie is an elite Brazilian Jiu-Jitsu instructor with years of training under his belt as well being the mentor of students such as the Diaz brothers, Nate and Nick.

On September 14, 2006, it was announced that Shamrock had signed a multimillion-dollar contract with startup MMA organization "The World Fighter" and was scheduled to fight in January 2007. However, Shamrock told Sherdog that the World Fighter contract no longer applied because it was entirely contingent on the organization getting a television contract with Showtime; the cable network instead agreed to air fights for the EliteXC promotion.

On February 10, 2007, Shamrock lost his fight by disqualification to Renzo Gracie during the EliteXC event which was televised on Showtime. During the fight, Gracie repeatedly took Frank to the ground, but Shamrock kept active by stopping his positional advance and hitting knee strikes from the bottom. However, Shamrock delivered two of those knees to Gracie's head while both men were on the ground, and after a five-minute injury time out, Gracie was unable to continue. Referee Herb Dean disqualified Shamrock due to a foul (illegal strikes to the back of the head, and knees to the head of a grounded opponent). Dean had already warned Shamrock once earlier in the fight about striking to the back of the head—an illegal move under the Unified Rules of Mixed Martial Arts.

In December 2005, Shamrock opened his first school, Shamrock Martial Arts Academy in San Jose, California. Shamrock trains his students in kickboxing and submission wrestling. He managed Team Shamrock, his own fight team. In June 2006, Shamrock was chosen as a coach for the San Jose Razorclaws of the International Fight League. Debuting against Carlos Newton's Toronto Dragons on September 23, 2006, at the Mark in Moline, Illinois, The Dragons won 3–2. The Razorclaws subsequently lost 2–3 against the Ken Shamrock coached Nevada Lions on January 19, 2007.

Strikeforce
Shamrock and Phil Baroni had engaged in a war of words with YouTube videos following Shamrock's fight with Renzo Gracie. The two faced off at Strikeforce: Shamrock vs. Baroni, a co-promotion between EliteXC and Strikeforce on June 22, 2007, on pay-per-view.

Shamrock went on to out-strike Baroni in the first part of this fight in the stand-up. Shamrock was docked a point for using strikes to the back of the head while he had Baroni's back. In the second round, Shamrock took some strikes from Baroni, but he was able to regain control and drop Baroni, transition to his back and end the fight with a rear naked choke. Baroni refused to tap out and was choked unconscious. As soon as he regained his senses, he walked over to Shamrock, congratulated him and left the cage. By winning the match, Shamrock became the Strikeforce Middleweight Champion, thereby making him the first person to win a title in all three major North American fight promotions: the UFC, WEC and Strikeforce.

On January 11, 2008, it was announced that Shamrock would face Cung Le in a match on March 29, 2008, for the Strikeforce Middleweight Championship during the joint Strike force-Elite XC event at the HP Pavilion in San Jose, California. Le arguably controlled the fight, at times out-striking the more MMA-experienced Shamrock. At one point in the later stages of round 3 Shamrock appeared to have Le hurt but was unable to finish him with a barrage of punches against the cage. Le recovered and responded in the closing seconds of the round with more kicks and a spinning back fist. Shamrock was unable to answer the bell to begin round 4 due to a broken arm caused by one of Le's kicks and the fight was ruled a TKO as a result of corner stoppage. Shamrock indicated post-fight that these kicks had broken his right arm.

Frank publicly stated that he would like to face Ken Shamrock in the first quarter of 2009, until stating in an interview "there's no point in fighting Ken, he's finished, why beat on an old man?" causing the likelihood of this fight to now be very slim.
Afterwards, he said that he would like to fight Tito Ortiz and then Cung Le and then "do some boxing stuff."

On April 11, 2009, Shamrock was defeated by Nick Diaz by technical knock out.

Retirement
Shamrock announced his retirement from fighting on June 26, 2010, at Strikeforce: Fedor vs. Werdum.

Bellator MMA
On February 5, 2013, Shamrock signed with Bellator to coach on the promotions reality series titled Fight Master: Bellator MMA.

Submission grappling

RIZIN 
On October 15, 2017, Shamrock fought Pride veteran Kazushi Sakuraba in a grappling exhibition match at the 2017 Rizin World Grand Prix Opening Round in Fukuoka, Japan. The match ended with a draw decision.

Fighting style
Shamrock became known as a training pioneer, constantly seeking new influences to round up his game. Most of his fighting method rested in Pancrase's indigenous style of shoot wrestling (better known in the West as catch wrestling), but he later also learned orthodox kickboxing striking under Maurice Smith, who also taught him to improve his cardiovascular conditioning and natural athleticism. He also studied Jeet Kune Do before his UFC debut. Shamrock's improved cardio, along with an excellent defensive guard work learned from Tsuyoshi Kohsaka, enabled him to survive against superior opponents in order to seek for openings, which he capitalized on with aggressive strikes and submissions. Though not the first one in history, he was considered one of the greatest earlier mixed martial artists, excelling in all the fields of the game.

Personal life
Shamrock was married to a woman named Amy Warren until their separation and subsequent divorce in 2019. Together they have one child, a daughter named Nicolette who was born on April 24, 2008.  Shamrock also has a son named Frankie from a previous marriage. Shamrock runs a franchise of schools, a merchandising company, Frank Shamrock, Inc. (a personal asset management company), MMA Entertainment, and Mixed Martial Arts For Law Enforcement (a law enforcement training business).

In 1998, Shamrock had a falling out with his brother Ken and his father Bob; they would not communicate again until Bob became terminally ill years later. In separate interviews aired January 18, 2007 by Sherdog.com's Beatdown radio show, both Frank and Ken said they remain estranged - Frank claimed Ken has spurned all attempts at reconciliation; Ken accused Frank of treating their father poorly. As seen on Frank's Spike TV documentary, Bound by Blood, he and Ken have reconciled.  On January 14, 2010,  Bob Shamrock died due to health complications from diabetes.

In an interview with Sam Caplan of sportsline.com, Shamrock revealed he felt concerned with Ken's training methods, and when he confronted Ken, he was told "You don't have what it takes, you're not going to be a world champion and I want you to run my gyms for the rest of your life."  This spurred him on to leave which led to the estrangement of both Ken and Bob (who took Ken's side in the disagreement).
He also stated that he would be happy to fight against Ken, should the opportunity arise.

Shamrock is a commentator and fighter on the EA Sports MMA video game which was released in 2010.  Shamrock is also featured in the award-winning documentary on the sport of mixed martial arts titled Fight Life, released in 2013. The film is directed by James Z. Feng and produced by RiLL Films.

Shamrock landed a guest role as Hammer on Walker, Texas Ranger and the main role in a Burger King commercial. He was featured as Damien in the 2005 movie No Rules and was uncredited in an episode of Oz.  On November 18, 2010, Shamrock appeared as a guest on Late Night with Jimmy Fallon.

In October 2012, Shamrock released his autobiography Uncaged: My Life as a Champion MMA Fighter.  Shamrock also wrote the Wiley book Mixed Martial Arts for Dummies.

Shamrock is an advocate for the use of cannabis, which he says helped eliminate his reliance on pharmaceutical drugs.  In January 2017 Shamrock launched The Bakeout, an online talk show seeking to "uplift, unite, educate, challenge, and encourage viewers in a manner consistent with the teachings of the healing powers of cannabis".

On January 14, 2018, sports announcer Mauro Ranallo stated that Shamrock saved his life when Shamrock performed the Heimlich maneuver on Ranallo as he was choking.

Championships and accomplishments
Pancrase Hybrid Wrestling
Interim King of Pancrase (One time)
Ultimate Fighting Championship
UFC Light Heavyweight Championship (One time; first)
Four successful title defenses
Headlined the First UFC event in Brazil
Fastest Submission in the History of the UFC Light Heavyweight division (0:16)
Undefeated in the UFC (5–0)
Strikeforce
First MMA fighter to win championships in UFC, WEC & Strikeforce
Strikeforce Middleweight Championship (One time, first)
Fastest Knockout in Strikeforce History (0:20)
World Extreme Cagefighting
WEC Light Heavyweight Championship (One time, first)
Sherdog
Mixed Martial Arts Hall of Fame
Black Belt Magazine
1998 Full-Contact Fighter of the Year
Wrestling Observer Newsletter
1998 Most Outstanding Fighter
1999 Most Outstanding Fighter
1999 Fight of the Year vs. Tito Ortiz on September 24, 1999
1990's Fighter of the Decade
Inside MMA
2008 Fight of the Year Bazzie Award vs. Cung Le on March 29

Mixed martial arts record

|-
| Loss
| align=center| 
| Nick Diaz
| TKO (punches)
| Strikeforce: Shamrock vs. Diaz
| 
| align=center| 2
| align=center| 3:57
| San Jose, California, United States
| 
|-
| Loss
| align=center| 23–9–2
| Cung Le
| TKO (broken arm)
| Strikeforce: Shamrock vs. Le
| 
| align=center| 3
| align=center| 5:00
| San Jose, California, United States
| 
|-
| Win
| align=center| 23–8–2
| Phil Baroni
| Technical Submission (rear-naked choke)
| Strikeforce Shamrock vs. Baroni
| 
| align=center| 2
| align=center| 4:00
| San Jose, California, United States
| 
|-
| Loss
| align=center| 22–8–2
| Renzo Gracie
| DQ (knees to downed opponent)
| EliteXC Destiny
| 
| align=center| 2
| align=center| 2:00
| Southaven, Mississippi, United States
|
|-
| Win
| align=center| 22–7–2
| Cesar Gracie
| KO (punches)
| Strikeforce: Shamrock vs. Gracie
| 
| align=center| 1
| align=center| 0:20
| San Jose, California, United States
| 
|-
| Win
| align=center| 21–7–2
| Bryan Pardoe
| Submission (armbar)
| WEC 6: Return of a Legend
| 
| align=center| 1
| align=center| 1:46
| Lemoore, California, United States
| 
|-
| Win
| align=center| 20–7–2
| Elvis Sinosic
| Decision (split)
| K-1 World Grand Prix 2000
| 
| align=center| 5
| align=center| 3:00
| Tokyo, Japan
|
|-
| Win
| align=center| 19–7–2
| Tito Ortiz
| TKO (submission to punches)
| UFC 22
| 
| align=center| 4
| align=center| 4:50
| Lake Charles, Louisiana, United States
| 
|-
| Draw
| align=center| 18–7–2
| Kiyoshi Tamura
| Draw
| Rings: Rise 2nd
| 
| align=center| 1
| align=center| 20:00
| Japan
|
|-
| Win
| align=center| 18–7–1
| John Lober
| TKO (submission to punches)
| UFC Brazil
| 
| align=center| 1
| align=center| 7:40
| São Paulo, Brazil
| 
|-
| Win
| align=center| 17–7–1
| Jeremy Horn
| Submission (kneebar)
| UFC 17
| 
| align=center| 1
| align=center| 16:28
| Mobile, Alabama, United States
| 
|-
| Win
| align=center| 16–7–1
| Igor Zinoviev
| KO (slam)
| UFC 16
| 
| align=center| 1
| align=center| 0:22
| New Orleans, Louisiana, United States
| 
|-
| Win
| align=center| 15–7–1
| Kevin Jackson
| Submission (armbar)
| UFC Japan
| 
| align=center| 1
| align=center| 0:16
| Yokohama, Japan
| 
|-
| Win
| align=center| 14–7–1
| Enson Inoue
| DQ (Egan Inoue ran into the ring)
| Vale Tudo Japan 1997
| 
| align=center| 2
| align=center| 7:17
| Tokyo, Japan
|
|-
| Win
| align=center| 13–7–1
| Wes Gassaway
| DQ (rope escapes)
| World Pankration Championships 1
| 
| align=center| 1
| align=center| 11:54
| Texas, United States
|
|-
| Win
| align=center| 12–7–1
| Tsuyoshi Kohsaka
| Decision (unanimous)
| Rings: Extension Fighting 7
| 
| align=center| 1
| align=center| 30:00
| Japan
|
|-
| Loss
| align=center| 11–7–1
| John Lober
| Technical Decision (split)
| SuperBrawl 3
| 
| align=center| 1
| align=center| 30:00
| Honolulu, Hawaii, United States
|
|-
| Loss
| align=center| 11–6–1
| Kiuma Kunioku
| Decision (unanimous)
| Pancrase: Truth 10
| 
| align=center| 1
| align=center| 20:00
| Tokyo, Japan
|
|-
| Loss
| align=center| 11–5–1
| Yuki Kondo
| KO (head kick)
| Pancrase: 1996 Anniversary Show
| 
| align=center| 1
| align=center| 12:43
| Chiba, Japan
|
|-
| Win
| align=center| 11–4–1
| Manabu Yamada
| Submission (rear-naked choke)
| Pancrase: 1996 Neo-Blood Tournament, Round 1
| 
| align=center| 1
| align=center| 12:44
| Tokyo, Japan
|
|-
| Loss
| align=center| 10–4–1
| Bas Rutten
| TKO (doctor stoppage)
| Pancrase: Truth 5
| 
| align=center| 1
| align=center| 11:11
| Tokyo, Japan
| 
|-
| Win
| align=center| 
| Osami Shibuya
| Decision (unanimous)
| Pancrase: Truth 4
| 
| align=center| 1
| align=center| 15:00
| Tokyo, Japan
|
|-
| Win
| align=center| 9–3–1
| Ryushi Yanagisawa
| Decision (unanimous)
| Pancrase: Truth 2
| 
| align=center| 1
| align=center| 20:00
| Kobe, Japan
|
|-
| Win
| align=center| 8–3–1
| Minoru Suzuki
| Submission (kneebar)
| Pancrase: Truth 1
| 
| align=center| 1
| align=center| 22:53
| Yokohama, Japan
| 
|-
| Win
| align=center| 7–3–1
| Vernon White
| Submission (achilles lock)
| Pancrase: Eyes of Beast 7
| 
| align=center| 1
| align=center| 5:23
| Sapporo, Japan
|
|-
| Win
| align=center| 6–3–1
| Masakatsu Funaki
| Submission (toe hold)
| Pancrase: Eyes of Beast 6
| 
| align=center| 1
| align=center| 10:31
| Yokohama, Japan
|
|-
| Win
| align=center| 5–3–1
| Takafumi Ito
| Submission (rear-naked choke)
| Pancrase: 1995 Anniversary Show
| 
| align=center| 1
| align=center| 7:23
| Tokyo, Japan
|
|-
| Loss
| align=center| 4–3–1
| Bas Rutten
| Decision (split)
| Pancrase: 1995 Neo-Blood Tournament Second Round
| 
| align=center| 1
| align=center| 15:00
| Tokyo, Japan
|
|-
| Win
| align=center| 4–2–1
| Takaku Fuke
| Submission (rear-naked choke)
| Pancrase: Eyes of Beast 5
| 
| align=center| 1
| align=center| 8:16
| Sapporo, Hokkaido, Japan
|
|-
| Draw
| align=center| 3–2–1
| Allan Goes
| Draw
| Pancrase: Eyes of Beast 4
| 
| align=center| 1
| align=center| 10:00
| Chiba, Chiba, Japan
|
|-
| Win
| align=center| 3–2
| Minoru Suzuki
| Submission (rear-naked Choke)
| Pancrase: Eyes of Beast 3
| 
| align=center| 1
| align=center| 3:23
| Nagoya, Japan
|
|-
| Loss
| align=center| 2–2
| Masakatsu Funaki
| Submission (toe hold)
| Pancrase: Eyes of Beast 2
| 
| align=center| 1
| align=center| 5:11
| Yokohama, Kanagawa, Japan
|
|-
| Win
| align=center| 2–1
| Katsuomi Inagaki
| Submission (armbar)
| Pancrase: Eyes of Beast 1
| 
| align=center| 1
| align=center| 6:14
| Nagoya, Aichi, Japan
|
|-
| Loss
| align=center| 1–1
| Manabu Yamada
| Submission (achilles lock)
| rowspan=2| Pancrase: King of Pancrase Tournament Opening Round
| rowspan=2| 
| align=center| 1
| align=center| 8:38
| rowspan=2| Tokyo, Japan
|
|-
| Win
| align=center| 1–0
| Bas Rutten
| Decision (majority) 
| align=center| 1
| align=center| 10:00
|

Kickboxing record

|- bgcolor="#CCFFCC"
|2001-08-11 || Win  ||align=left| Shannon Ritch ||K-1 World Grand Prix 2001 in Las Vegas ||Las Vegas, Nevada, United States || TKO (injury) || 1 || 0:53 || 1–0
|-
| colspan=9 | Legend:

Submission grappling record
KO PUNCHES
|- style="text-align:center; background:#f0f0f0;"
| style="border-style:none none solid solid; "|Result
| style="border-style:none none solid solid; "|Opponent
| style="border-style:none none solid solid; "|Method
| style="border-style:none none solid solid; "|Event
| style="border-style:none none solid solid; "|Date
| style="border-style:none none solid solid; "|Round
| style="border-style:none none solid solid; "|Time
| style="border-style:none none solid solid; "|Notes
|-
|Draw|| Kazushi Sakuraba || Draw ||Rizin World Grand Prix 2017: Opening Round - Part 2|| October 15, 2017|| 1 || 0:56 ||
|-
|Win|| Dan Henderson || Submission (heel hook) ||The Contenders || October 11, 1997|| || ||
|-

Footnotes

External links
 
 Frank Shamrock Martial Arts Academy
 
 
 
 Five Ounces of Pain: Interview with Frank Shamrock
 Frank's Interview with John Kline of Elevation Radio

Living people
1972 births
American male mixed martial artists
American male kickboxers
American catch wrestlers
American adoptees
American mixed martial artists of Mexican descent
Ultimate Fighting Championship male fighters
Ultimate Fighting Championship champions
Strikeforce (mixed martial arts) champions
World Extreme Cagefighting champions
Kickboxers from California
Mixed martial artists from California
Middleweight mixed martial artists
Mixed martial artists utilizing catch wrestling
Mixed martial artists utilizing Jeet Kune Do
American cannabis activists